Elections to Derry City Council were held on 15 May 1985 on the same day as the other Northern Irish local government elections. The election used five district electoral areas to elect a total of 30 councillors.

Election results

Note: "Votes" are the first preference votes.

Districts summary

|- class="unsortable" align="centre"
!rowspan=2 align="left"|Ward
! % 
!Cllrs
! % 
!Cllrs
! %
!Cllrs
! %
!Cllrs
! % 
!Cllrs
! % 
!Cllrs
!rowspan=2|TotalCllrs
|- class="unsortable" align="center"
!colspan=2 bgcolor="" | SDLP
!colspan=2 bgcolor="" | DUP
!colspan=2 bgcolor="" | Sinn Féin
!colspan=2 bgcolor="" | UUP
!colspan=2 bgcolor="" | IIP
!colspan=2 bgcolor="white"| Others
|-
|align="left"|Cityside
|bgcolor="#99FF66"|46.5
|bgcolor="#99FF66"|3
|0.0
|0
|39.6
|3
|0.0
|0
|10.0
|0
|3.9
|0
|6
|-
|align="left"|Northland
|bgcolor="#99FF66"|53.7
|bgcolor="#99FF66"|3
|5.4
|0
|15.5
|1
|11.3
|1
|10.9
|1
|3.2
|0
|6
|-
|align="left"|Rural
|bgcolor="#99FF66"|38.2
|bgcolor="#99FF66"|3
|29.3
|2
|6.4
|0
|22.9
|2
|3.2
|0
|0.0
|0
|7
|-
|align="left"|Shantallow
|bgcolor="#99FF66"|58.8
|bgcolor="#99FF66"|4
|0.0
|0
|25.3
|1
|0.0
|0
|10.6
|0
|5.3
|0
|5
|-
|align="left"|Waterside
|18.5
|1
|bgcolor="#D46A4C"|42.4
|bgcolor="#D46A4C"|3
|6.2
|0
|24.2
|2
|3.3
|0
|5.4
|0
|6
|-
|- class="unsortable" class="sortbottom" style="background:#C9C9C9"
|align="left"| Total
|41.9
|14
|17.3
|5
|17.1
|5
|13.1
|5
|7.2
|1
|3.4
|0
|30
|-
|}

District results

Cityside

1985: 3 x SDLP, 3 x Sinn Féin

Northland

1985: 3 x SDLP, 1 x Sinn Féin, 1 x UUP, 1 x IIP

Rural

1985: 3 x SDLP, 2 x DUP, 2 x UUP

Shantallow

1985: 4 x SDLP, 1 x Sinn Féin

Waterside

1985: 3 x DUP, 2 x UUP, 1 x SDLP

References

Derry City Council elections
Derry